Bill or Billy Collins may refer to:

 Bill Collins (American football player) (1901–1976), American football player
 Bill Collins (American football coach) (1894–?), American college football player and coach
 Bill Collins (athlete) (born 1950), American athlete
 Bill Collins (baker) (1931–2021), co-inventor of the Chorleywood process
 Bill Collins (catcher) (1863–1893), American baseball player
 Bill Collins (footballer, born 1871) (1871–1942), Australian footballer for Carlton
 Bill Collins (footballer, born 1920) (1920–2010), aka Buster Collins, Northern Irish footballer
 Bill Collins (footballer, born 1933) (1933–2004), Australian footballer for Hawthorn
 Bill Collins (golfer) (1928–2006), American professional golfer
 Bill Collins (ice hockey) (born 1943), Canadian former ice hockey player
 Bill Collins (outfielder) (1882–1961), American baseball player
 Bill Collins (racecaller) (1928–1997), Australian racecaller
 Bill Collins (television presenter) (1934–2019), Australian film critic and television presenter
 Billy Collins (Australian footballer) (1909–1987), Australian footballer for Melbourne
 Billy Collins (born 1941), American poet
 Billy Collins Jr. (1961–1984), American professional boxer

See also
 William Collins (disambiguation)
 Billy Collings (born 1940), Scottish footballer